The Water Polo Australia Hall of Fame, located in Sydney, is a hall of fame dedicated to honoring players, coaches and officials who have contributed greatly to the game of water polo in Australia. It was established in 2009 by Water Polo Australia, which is the national governing body in the country.

Inductees
As of 2019, 30 individuals have been elected.

2000s

2009
 Wendy Meloncelli
 Andrew Kerr
 Charles Turner
 Debbie Handley
 Peter Montgomery
 Debbie Watson
 Tom Hoad
 Cathy Parkes
 John Whitehouse

2010s

2010
 Bill Berge-Phillips
 David Woods
 Ray Smee
 John O'Brien
 David Neesham
 Bridgette Gusterson

2011
 Leanne Barnes
 Peter Kerr
 Ian Mills
 Les Nunn
 Michael Withers
 Chris Wybrow

2012
 Allan Charleston
 Leon Wiegard
 Peter Bennett

2014
 Ron Wootton
 Naomi McCarthy
 Michael Turner

2019
 Bronwyn Smith
 Gavin Woods
 István Görgényi

See also
 International Swimming Hall of Fame
 USA Water Polo Hall of Fame

References

External links
 Hall of Fame - Water Polo Australia

Hall of Fame
Australia
Water Polo
Water Polo
Awards established in 2009